The Irish Farmers' Association (IFA) (Irish: Feirmeoirí Aontaithe na hÉireann) is a national organisation to represent the interests of all sectors of farming in the Republic of Ireland. The IFA is Ireland's largest farming representative organisation and has operated more than 60 years.

The IFA represents Irish farmers at home and in Europe, lobbying and campaigning for improved conditions and incomes for farm families. It also provides representation, support and advice to members on an individual basis.

IFA is a democratic association, organised in branches, county executive and national committees.

The IFA's head office is at the Irish Farm Centre, in Bluebell, Dublin. It also maintains 12 regional offices and an office in Brussels.

History
It was founded in January 1955 as the National Farmers Association (NFA), aiming to lead Irish farmers out of the depression and deprivation which had dominated rural Ireland for decades.

The NFA merged in the 1960s with four smaller organisations representing specific sectors (including Leinster Milk Producers (now Fresh Milk Producers), beet growers and horticulture) to form the Irish Farmers Association – the IFA.

In the 1972 referendum on Irish membership of the European Economic Community, the IFA campaigned for a "yes" vote, seeking access to European markets and higher prices for agricultural produce.

The IFA denounced the European Union–Mercosur Free Trade Agreement as a "disgraceful and feeble sell-out".

Salary controversy
In November 2015 Eddie Downey (President) and Pat Smith (General Secretary) resigned following controversy over salaries. Smith's salary in 2013 had been €535,000. He resigned on 18 November. A week later members of the organisation's national executive council were informed that Smith had been given a €2m severance payment and €2.7m pension. Eddie Downey admitted he had signed off this agreement, and resigned. Downey was earning €147,000 a year plus €50,000 in add-ons when he resigned.

The IFA confirmed that former IFA chief economist Con Lucey — who had attempted to raise concerns over financial issues and transparency before quitting under duress in 2014 — would oversee a review of salaries and expenses.

List of presidents

References

External links

Organisations based in Dublin (city)
Organizations established in 1955
Agricultural organisations based in Ireland
Farmers' organizations
1955 establishments in Ireland
Agrarianism in Ireland